Charles McLelland (24 March 1953 – 26 December 2020) was a Scottish football player and manager. He played for Aberdeen, Motherwell, Dundee and Montrose. After retiring as a player, he joined the Montrose coaching staff and briefly served as co-manager of the team.

References

External links 
 

1953 births
2020 deaths
Footballers from Glasgow
Association football defenders
Scottish footballers
Aberdeen F.C. players
Motherwell F.C. players
Dundee F.C. players
Montrose F.C. players
Scottish Football League players
Scottish football managers
Montrose F.C. managers
Scotland under-23 international footballers
Scottish Football League managers